The London Midland and Scottish Railway (LMS) Hughes Crab or Horwich Mogul is a class of mixed-traffic 2-6-0 steam locomotive built between 1926 and 1932. They are noted for their appearance with large steeply-angled cylinders to accommodate a restricted loading gauge.

Overview 
Designed by George Hughes, Chief Mechanical Engineer of the LMS, and built at the ex-L&YR works at Horwich and the ex-LNWR works at Crewe.  The inspiration came from a Caledonian Railway  design at the grouping, however the cylinders were too large for the LMS's English section's loading gauge, resulting in Hughes having to adapt the concept. They were put into service by his successor, Henry Fowler. The design incorporated a number of advanced features for the time such as long travel valves, compensated brake gear, a new design of tender and a new boiler, the latter based on the one fitted to Hughes's four-cylinder Baltic tank locomotives built at Horwich.

Fowler tried to have the design altered to use standard Derby components. However the design process and pre-production were sufficiently advanced to prevent the fitting of a smaller Derby pattern boiler, and the cylinders and motion also remained as designed by Hughes. The tender was replaced by a Derby standard type, which was narrower than the cab. Standard Midland Railway boiler fittings and brake equipment were also substituted, and the class became something of a hybrid design. Nevertheless they performed rather well in most circumstances and gained a strong reputation in some areas, especially in Scotland, where they became the preferred locomotive for heavy unfitted mineral work on difficult routes, even after the introduction of the Stanier mixed traffic 4-6-0s.

Experiments
In 1931 five engines, 13118, 13122, 13124, 13125 and 13129 were fitted with Lentz valve gear. They were renumbered as 42818, 42822, 42824, 42825 and 42829 after nationalisation. In 1953 the Lentz valve gear on these engines was replaced with Reidinger valve gear.

Modifications of the chimney and blast pipe improved the maximum rate to  but no other engine was modified to take advantage of this.

Successor
When an order was placed by the traffic department for delivery of 40 more examples of this type, the new Chief Mechanical Engineer, William Stanier, decided to introduce a taper boiler version, in line with his policy of using taper boilers on all new locomotive designs. There were so many changes to the layout of the locomotive,  such as higher boiler pressure and smaller cylinders, that it became a new design, the LMS Stanier Mogul.

Numbering

Initially numbered 13000–244, as standard locomotives they were given the lower numbers 2700–2944 in the LMS 1933 renumbering scheme.  After being taken into British Railways stock an additional 40000 was added to their numbers, becoming 42700–42944.

Withdrawal
The class survived intact until 1961 when three were withdrawn. The remainder of the class were withdrawn over the next six years.

Accidents and incidents
On 19 May 1957, locomotive No. 42806 was derailed at Parkhouse, Ayr.
On 21 January 1960, in the Settle rail crash, a freight train derailed following damage to the track from a failed connecting rod assembly on a passenger locomotive on the adjacent track. The derailed locomotive, No 42881, struck the stopped passenger train, killing five passengers.

Nicknames
These locomotives were referred to by train spotters as "Crabs", although the term "Horwich mogul" was preferred by the LMS. Several authors have claimed that this refers to the resemblance to a crab's pincers of the outside cylinders and valve motion.
Another suggestion is that the nickname refers to the "scuttling" motion felt on the footplate when the engine is being worked hard, due largely to the inclined cylinders, producing a sensation that it is walking along the track. In some areas they also received the nickname "frothblowers" from their tendency to prime easily when the boiler was overfilled, or the feedwater contaminated.

Preservation

Survivors

Three have survived to preservation

Note: Engine numbers in bold mean their current number.

Models 

Models exist in 00 gauge. An old model was produced by Lima, and an updated model has since been produced by Bachmann. N gauge models are produced by Graham Farish.

Notes

References

External links 

5 Hughes Crab
2-6-0 locomotives
Railway locomotives introduced in 1926
Standard gauge steam locomotives of Great Britain